The 2013–14 season is Sunray Cave JC Sun Hei's 20th season in the Hong Kong First Division League. Sunray Cave JC Sun Hei will compete in the First Division League, Senior Challenge Shield and FA Cup in this season.

Key events
 24 May 2013: Spanish midfielder José María Díaz Muñoz joins Thailand Regional League North-East Division club Roi Et United for free.
 1 June 2013: Chinese-born Hong Kong midfielder Jing Teng joins the club from newly relegated Wofoo Tai Po for free.
 1 June 2013: Hong Kong defender Pak Wing Chak leaves the club and joins newly promoted First Division club Eastern Salon for an undisclosed fee.
 1 June 2013: Hong Kong striker Leung Tsz Chun leaves the club and joins newly promoted First Division club Eastern Salon for an undisclosed fee.
 1 June 2013: Chinese-born Hongkonger goalkeeper Zhang Chunhui leaves the club and rejoins fellow First Division club South China for an undisclosed fee.
 2 June 2013: Hong Kong defender Chow Siu Chung signs a professional contract with the club.
 3 June 2013: Hong Kong defender Chueng Chi Yung leaves the club and joins newly promoted First Division club I-Sky Yuen Long for free.
 5 June 2013: Hong Kong defender Li Hang Wui leaves the club and joins fellow First Division club Yokohama FC Hong Kong for an undisclosed fee.
 5 June 2013: Hong Kong midfielder Yeung Chi Lun leaves the club and joins newly promoted First Division club Happy Valley for free.
 7 June 2013: Hong Kong goalkeeper Cheung King Wah leaves the club and joins fellow First Division club Yokohama FC Hong Kong for an undisclosed fee.
 12 June 2013: Guinean striker Mamadou Barry leaves the club and joins fellow First Division club South China for free.
 17 June 2013: Hong Kong defender Lui Man Tik joins the club from fellow First Division club Kitchee on a season-long loan.
 17 June 2013:English-born Hong Kong striker James Ha joins the club from fellow First Division club Kitchee on a season-long loan.
 17 June 2013:Brazilian-born Hong Kong defender Leung Robson Augusto Ka Hai joins the club from fellow First Division club Kitchee on a season-long loan.
 20 June 2013: Hong Kong goalkeeper Wong Tsz Him joins the club from fellow First Division club Biu Chun Rangers for an undisclosed fee.
 20 June 2013: Hong Kong goalkeeper Wong Tsz Chung signs a professional contract with the club.
 20 June 2013: Hong Kong forward Chan Ho Fung joins the club from fellow First Division club Kitchee on a season-long loan.
 28 June 2013: Hong Kong midfielder Choi Kwok Wai leaves the club and joins newly promoted First Division club Happy Valley for an undisclosed fee.
 6 August 2013: Serbian midfielder Mirko Teodorović joins the club from fellow First Division club Yokohama FC Hong Kong on a free transfer.
 6 August 2013: Brazil-born Hong Kong striker Filipe de Souza Conceicao joins the club on loan from fellow First Division club South China until the end of the season.
 9 August 2013: Hong Kong defender Stewart Alexander Parin joins the club from Second Division club Kwai Tsing on a free transfer.

Players

Squad information

Last update: 9 August 2013
Source: Sunray Cave JC Sun Hei
Ordered by squad number.
LPLocal player; FPForeign player; NRNon-registered player

Transfers

In

Out

Loan In

Loan out

Squad statistics

Overall Stats
{|class="wikitable" style="text-align: center;"
|-
!width="100"|
!width="60"|First Division
!width="60"|Senior Shield
!width="60"|FA Cup
!width="60"|Total Stats
|-
|align=left|Games played    ||  0  ||  0  || 0  || 0
|-
|align=left|Games won       ||  0  ||  0  || 0  || 0
|-
|align=left|Games drawn     ||  0  ||  0  || 0  || 0
|-
|align=left|Games lost      ||  0  ||  0  || 0  || 0
|-
|align=left|Goals for       ||  0  ||  0  || 0  || 0
|-
|align=left|Goals against   ||  0  ||  0  || 0  || 0
|- =
|align=left|Players used    ||  0  ||  0  || 0  || 01
|-
|align=left|Yellow cards    ||  0  ||  0  || 0  || 0
|-
|align=left|Red cards       ||  0  ||  0  || 0  || 0
|-

Players Used: Sunray Cave JC Sun Hei have used a total of 0 different players in all competitions.

Top scorers

Disciplinary record

Starting 11
This will show the most used players in each position, based on Sunray Cave JC Sun Hei's typical starting formation once the season commences.

Captains

Competitions

Overall

First Division League

Classification

Results summary

Results by round

Matches

Pre-season friendlies

First Division League

Senior Shield

Notes

References

Sun Hei SC seasons
Sun